Touro Synagogue is a Reform synagogue in New Orleans, Louisiana. It was named after Judah Touro, the son of Isaac Touro, the namesake of the country's oldest synagogue, Touro Synagogue in Newport, Rhode Island.

The New Orleans Touro Synagogue is one of the oldest synagogues in the United States and the oldest in the country outside the original Thirteen Colonies. The current synagogue was founded in 1881 from the merger of two older (originally Orthodox) congregations: the German Jewish Shangarai Chasset congregation, and Portuguese Jewish (Sephardic) Nefutzot Yehudah congregation.

The current sanctuary building on St. Charles Avenue in Uptown New Orleans was constructed in 1908 and dedicated 1 January 1909.

Clergy

External links

Touro Synagogue

Touro Synagogue History

Synagogues in New Orleans
Reform synagogues in Louisiana
Sephardi Jewish culture in the United States
Sephardi Reform Judaism